Islamic Assembly of Ladies (Mijim'-e 'Islâmi-ye Banuan) is an Iranian reformist all-female political party. The party is an ally of National Trust Party.

See also 
 Association of the Women of the Islamic Republic
 Zeynab Society

References

Reformist political groups in Iran
Women's rights in Iran
Political parties established in 1998
1998 establishments in Iran
Iranian women's political groups